Anacyclus valentinus  is the type species for the genus Anacyclus in the tribe Anthemideae and family Asteraceae.

References

External links

Anthemideae
Plants described in 1753
Taxa named by Carl Linnaeus